Eoin Brislane (born 1981) is an Irish hurler who played as a midfielder for the Tipperary and Meath senior teams.

Born in Toomevara, County Tipperary, Brislane first played competitive hurling during his schooling at St. Joseph's College in Borrisoleigh. He arrived on the inter-county scene at the age of seventeen when he first linked up with the Tipperary minor team, before later joining the under-21 side. He made his senior debut during the 2003 league. Brislane went on to play a bit part for the team before joining the Meath senior team in 2007.

At club level Brislane is a two-time Munster medalist with Toomevara. In addition to this he has also won seven championship medals.

Throughout his career Brislane made 3 championship appearances. He retired from inter-county hurling following the conclusion of the 2008 Christy Ring Cup.

Management

In retirement from playing Brislane became involved in team management and coaching. In 2009 he took over as manager of the Tipperary intermediate and senior camogie teams.

He led Monaleen to Limerick Premier Intermediate Hurling Championship and Munster Intermediate Club Hurling Championship titles in 2022, and to the All-Ireland Intermediate Hurling Championship title in January 2023.

Honours

Team

Toomevara
Tipperary Senior Club Hurling Championship (7): 1999, 2000, 2001, 2003, 2004, 2006, 2008
Munster Senior Club Hurling Championship (2): 2004, 2006
North Tipperary Junior C Hurling Championship (1): 2022

Tipperary
Munster Minor Hurling Championship (1): 1999

References 

1981 births
Living people
Toomevara hurlers
Tipperary inter-county hurlers
Meath inter-county hurlers
Hurling managers